The Bisesero Genocide Memorial, near Karongi-Kibuye - Western Rwanda, which commemorates the Rwandan genocide in 1994. 40,000 people died here.

Location
The memorial is on a hill at the small settlement of Bisesero which is about 60 km by road from Kibuye, Rwanda.

History

Genocide against the Tutsi began in April 1994. 40,000 people died in the area around Bisesero. Unusually these people offered some defense and they appealed to French peace keeping troops for assistance. The troops had no mandate to intervene and they withdrew from the carnage. 40,000 Rwandans died around Bisesero.

This memorial centre is one of six major centers in Rwanda that commemorate the 1994 Tutsi genocide. The others are the Kigali Memorial Centre, Murambi Memorial Centre and Ntarama Genocide Memorial Centre and others at Nyamata and Nyarubuye.

References

External links

Genocide Archive of Rwanda 

Buildings and structures in Kigali
Rwandan genocide museums
Museums in Rwanda
Rwandan genocide